Reptilian is the fifth studio album by the Norwegian extreme metal band Keep of Kalessin, released on 10 May 2010 in Europe and on 8 June 2010 in North America through Nuclear Blast. The album peaked at number two on the Norwegian record chart, VG-lista. This would be the last album with Torbjørn "Thebon" Schei on vocals before being fired in 2013.

Track listing

Members
 Arnt "Obsidian C." Grønbech - guitars, keyboards, backing vocals
 Torbjørn "Thebon" Schei - lead vocals
 Robin "Wizziac" Isaksen - bass, backing vocals
 Vegar "Vyl" Larsen - drums
 The Dragonchoir - choir, backing vocals
 Daniel Bergstrand - producer, mixer

Charts

References

2010 albums
Keep of Kalessin albums
Nuclear Blast albums
Indie Recordings albums